Vincennes is an unincorporated community in the southern part of Lee County, Iowa, United States. It lies near the junction of 320th Street and Iowa Highway 27, 2.5 miles south of Argyle. Its elevation is 554 feet.

History 
A post office named Camargo began operations in 1852. The name was changed to Vincennes in 1858. The post office at Vincennes closed in 1920.

Vincennes' population was estimated at 125 in 1877, was 128 in 1902. and was 115 in 1925.

Vincennes was also known as Sand Point circa 1925.

References 

Unincorporated communities in Lee County, Iowa
Unincorporated communities in Iowa
Fort Madison–Keokuk, IA-IL-MO Micropolitan Statistical Area